La Gabarra  Is a corregimiento located in a rural area of the municipality of Tibú, department of Norte de Santander, Colombia.

Climate
La Gabarra has a tropical rainforest climate (Af) with heavy rainfall from January to March and very heavy rainfall in the remaining months with extremely heavy rainfall in October and November.

References

Populated places in the Norte de Santander Department